Verdun is a provincial electoral district in the Montreal region of Quebec, Canada that elects members to the National Assembly of Quebec. Its territory corresponds exactly to the borough of Verdun of the city of Montreal.

It was created for the 1966 election from Montréal-Verdun electoral district.

In the change from the 2001 to the 2011 electoral map, its territory was unchanged.

Members of the Legislative Assembly / National Assembly
This riding has elected the following Members of the National Assembly:

Election results

* Result compared to Action démocratique

* Result compared to UFP

|-

|-

|-

|-

|-

|-

|Independent
|Robert Lindblad
|align="right"|54
|align="right"|0.19
|align="right"|–
|-

|}
* Result compared to PDS

|-

|-

|Natural law
|Gilles Bigras
|align="right"|204
|align="right"|0.61
|align="right"|+0.12

|-

|Socialist Democracy
|Daniel Pharand
|align="right"|151
|align="right"|0.46
|align="right"|-0.64*
|-

|Independent
|Gilles Noël
|align="right"|66
|align="right"|0.20
|align="right"|–

|-

|}
* Result compared to NDP

|-

|New Democratic
|Daniel Pharand
|align="right"|368
|align="right"|1.09
|align="right"|-0.71
|-

|CANADA!
|Deepak Massand
|align="right"|315
|align="right"|0.93
|align="right"|–
|-

|Natural law
|Nicola Masucci
|align="right"|167
|align="right"|0.50
|align="right"|–
|-

|Sovereignty
|Frédéric Richard
|align="right"|87
|align="right"|0.26
|align="right"|–
|-

|Development
|Aimé Pinette
|align="right"|87
|align="right"|0.26
|align="right"|–
|-

|}

|-

|New Democratic
|Richard Proulx
|align="right"|659
|align="right"|2.85
|align="right"|–
|-

|Progressive Conservative
|Jacques Leroux
|align="right"|216
|align="right"|0.93
|align="right"|–
|-

|Parti indépendantiste
|Guy Sauvé
|align="right"|183
|align="right"|0.79
|align="right"|–
|-

|-

|Humanist
|Laura Whelton
|align="right"|87
|align="right"|0.38
|align="right"|–
|-

|Christian Socialist
|Éric Charmettant
|align="right"|50
|align="right"|0.22
|align="right"|–

|-

|}

|-

|-

|-

|Democratic Alliance
|Seymour Small
|align="right"|315
|align="right"|1.05
|align="right"|–
|-

|Workers
|Robin Gagnon 
|align="right"|150
|align="right"|0.50
|align="right"|-
|-

|}

|-

|Parti créditiste
|Camille Lévesque
|align="right"|1,109
|align="right"|3.84
|align="right"|–
|-

|-

|}

|-

|-

|-

|Independent
|Suzanne Ste-Marie Brassard
|align="right"|862
|align="right"|2.18
|align="right"|–
|-

|Independent
|Gaston Gagnier
|align="right"|259
|align="right"|0.66
|align="right"|–
|-

|New Democratic
|Gendron E. Haines
|align="right"|186
|align="right"|0.47
|align="right"|–
|}

|-

|-

|RIN 
|Réginald (Reggie) Chartrand
|align="right"|1,198
|align="right"|4.14
|-

|Ralliement national
|René Lassonde
|align="right"|306
|align="right"|1.06
|}

References

External links
Information
 Elections Quebec

Election results
 Election results (National Assembly)
 Election results (QuébecPolitique)

Maps
 2011 map (PDF)
 2001 map (Flash)
2001–2011 changes (Flash)
1992–2001 changes (Flash)
 Electoral map of Montreal region
 Quebec electoral map, 2011

Provincial electoral districts of Montreal
Quebec provincial electoral districts
Verdun, Quebec